Frequencies from Planet Ten is the debut album by British stoner metal band Orange Goblin. It was released in 1997 by Rise Above Records. In 2002, it was reissued as a double CD coupled with their second album, Time Travelling Blues (1998). The reissue version contains two bonus tracks, both taken from their Man's Ruin EP, Nuclear Guru. The latter bonus track is a cover of Black Sabbath's "Hand of Doom". The original Japanese press also contains these two bonus tracks.

Both "Saruman's Wish" and "Lothlorian" have their basis in J. R. R. Tolkien's epic fantasy The Lord of the Rings. Saruman is an evil wizard and Lothlórien is a mythical forest which is home to a race of elves.

Track listing

Personnel 
Ben Ward – vocals
Pete O'Malley – guitar
Joe Hoare – guitar
Martyn Millard – bass
Duncan Gibbs – keyboards
Chris Turner – drums

References 

1997 debut albums
Orange Goblin albums
Rise Above Records albums